The 2000 FIVB World Grand Prix was the eighth women's volleyball tournament of its kind. It was held over four weeks in three countries and six cities throughout Asia: Hong Kong, Thailand, PR China, Chinese Taipei and Malaysia, cumulating with the final round at Araneta Coliseum in Quezon City, Philippines, from 24 to 27 August 2000.

Preliminary rounds

Ranking
The best four teams from the overall ranking are qualified for the final round.

|}

First round

Group A
Venue: Macau

|}

Group B
Venue: Yala, Thailand

|}

Second round

Group C
Venue: Kaohsiung, Taiwan

|}

Group D
Venue: Kuala Lumpur, Malaysia

|}

Third round

Group E
Venue: Yuxi, China

|}

Group F
Venue: Quezon City, Philippines

|}

Final round
Venue: Quezon City, Philippines

5th–8th place

5th–8th semifinals

|}

7th place match

|}

5th place match

|}

Final four

Semifinals

|}

3rd place match

|}

Final

|}

Final standings

Individual awards

Most Valuable Player:

Best Scorer:

Best Spiker:

Best Blocker:

Best Server:

Best Setter:

Best Receiver:

Best Libero:

Dream Team

Setter:

Middle Blockers:

Outside Hitters:

Opposite Spiker:

References
Archived Results

FIVB World Grand Prix
2000 in Philippine sport
International volleyball competitions hosted by the Philippines
2000
Sport in Quezon City